Dominion is a card game created by Donald X. Vaccarino and published by Rio Grande Games. It was the first deck-building game, and inspired a genre of games building on its central mechanic. Each player begins with a small deck of cards, which they improve by purchasing cards from a common supply that varies from game to game. Cards can help the player's deck function, impede their opponents, or provide victory points.
As of December 2022, fifteen expansions to the original Dominion have been released.

The game has a medieval theme with card names referencing pre-industrial, monarchical, and feudal social structures. Comparisons about the game's feel are often drawn with collectible card games such as Magic: The Gathering. Vaccarino, however, denies that Magic was the inspiration.  

When Dominion was released at the Spiel game fair in 2008, it was voted "best game of the fair" by the Fairplay polls. The next year it won the Spiel des Jahres and Deutscher Spiele Preis awards. It was one of five winning games in American Mensa's 2009 MindGame competition. By 2017, more than 2.5 million copies of Dominion and its expansions had been sold worldwide.

Gameplay

Cards and setup 
In a game of Dominion, two to four players compete to gather the most victory points by strategically building a deck of cards. Each player starts with a small deck containing a few weak cards, with which they acquire more cards with different and more powerful abilities. Some provide more of the in-game currency, "coins"; others let the player perform more actions or buy more cards per turn; others let them draw more cards, harm the other players, remove unwanted cards from their decks, or do other things. As players improve their decks, they also think about how to improve their scores; a powerful deck may be worth no victory points. The game has been compared to the "draft" gameplay style of collectible card games where players vie for the best deck from a common pool of cards.

Cards are classified into types, which are listed at the bottom of each card. The six types in the base set are:
 Victory cards have a victory point value at the end of the game but usually have no use while the game is in progress.
 Curse cards are like Victory cards but have a negative victory point value.
 Treasure cards generate coins which can be used to buy other cards during the Buy phase.
 Action cards have many kinds of effects, but by default only one may be played per turn. 
 Attack cards hurt other players, such as by forcing them to discard cards from their hand or gain Curse cards.
 Reaction cards can be triggered out of turn in response to certain events, such as other players' Attacks.

Cards may have more than one type; for instance, an Action might also be an Attack. Certain cards are affected by other cards' types; for instance, some Reactions are triggered when another player uses an Attack card.

In addition, cards are divided into two groups: base cards, which are present in every game, and kingdom cards, of which each game has a different assortment. The base cards consist of Curse cards, three kinds of Treasure, and three kinds of Victory cards. Kingdom cards are mostly actions, but some have other types, including Treasure and Victory. There is one pile of each card in the game; once the pile is empty, players can no longer buy that card. Together, these cards form the supply. Note that a few cards from expansions change these rules.

To begin a game, players decide on the kingdom cards they are going to use, either selecting them or choosing randomly, and setting out the supply. Cards from any sets of Dominion can be mixed freely, creating a large number of possible setups.  Then, each player gets the same starting deck of ten cards, consisting of seven Copper cards (low-value treasure) and three Estate cards (low-value victory). Each player shuffles their deck and draws the top five cards to form their hand.

During play

Each turn, the player gains one action and one buy and performs the following phases in order (abbreviated as "ABC" as a mnemonic for newer players):
 Action phase: The player can play one Action card from their hand, following the card's printed instructions. By default only one Action card may be played, but some cards have instructions that give the player permission to play additional Action cards that same turn. 
 Buy phase: The player can play any Treasure cards they want from their hand, generating coins. Then they may use the coins they have generated in their Action and Buy phases to purchase a card from the supply; if the player has no coins, they may still buy a card with a zero coin cost. By default only one card may be bought, but if a player has generated additional buys earlier in the turn, they may divide their coins among multiple purchases. Bought cards are added to the player's discard pile (and will later be shuffled into their deck).
 Clean-up phase: The player collects their hand and all played cards and places those into their discard pile. They then draw five new cards from their deck. Unused actions, buys, and coins do not carry over to future turns.

If the player must draw a card from their deck, but their deck is empty, they shuffle their discard pile to create a new deck. Some Action cards can trash cards, removing them from players' decks and into the Trash pile, where they are out of the game (though a few actions from expansions can recover them).

The game usually ends under one of two conditions: when the stack of Province cards (the highest-value Victory card in the base game) has been exhausted, or when any three stacks in the supply have been exhausted. Players then count the number of victory points in their decks, and the player with the highest score wins. Other end-game conditions have been introduced in the game's expansions.

Since possessing Victory cards is often necessary to win the game, but they usually have no value during gameplay, players must balance the acquisition of Victory cards with Action and Treasure cards that maintain the player's ability to play effective turns. Usually, the game's main strategy is to build a deck that maximizes the player's ability to draw hands that can buy Provinces (the most valuable Victory card).

Expansions 

Due to the game’s commercial success, several expansions have been released. The basic set is simple, but each expansion adds more complexity, typically through the addition of new kingdom cards but also through additional rules, such as adding new card types or changing the composition of each players' starting deck when using that expansion.  

Some expansions have added "landscapes" to the game setup. These are distinguished from cards by having landscape orientation rather than portrait, and do not enter the players' hand or deck, but are either resolved immediately or placed in the players' play area for later use. These have different effects on the game; for example, the Adventures expansion introduced the ability to buy Events, which provide immediate bonuses. Other expansions have introduced tokens for tracking game progression. The Prosperity expansion introduced victory point tokens, which can be earned by playing certain kingdom cards; these increase players' scores but do not dilute their decks with victory cards.  If players use kingdom cards that require these non-supply card stacks or tokens, these are set up alongside the supply prior to play.

Many reviews recommend buying expansions to increase the variety of the game, as cards from different sets may be freely mixed with each other.

 Intrigue introduced cards with multiple uses, which the player must choose between when they play the card, and Victory cards which have another type and provide an ability or bonus, making them useful before the game ends. Intrigue has been recommended as the first expansion to purchase after the base set for play.

 Seasides theme is the player's next turn. It introduced Duration cards, which have effects that last more than one turn. It also includes the first cards to have mats and tokens which track their effects.

 Alchemy was the first set to introduce a new base card: Potion, a Treasure card which is needed to buy most of the expansion's kingdom cards.

 Prosperitys theme is wealth. It introduced two more new base cards: a Victory card, Colony, and a Treasure card, Platinum. It also introduced many Treasures that are kingdom cards, and victory point tokens, which increase the players' score but are not part of their deck.

 Cornucopia has a theme of variety; there are cards that reward players for having different cards in their deck. It includes a card which causes an extra kingdom pile to be added to the game. It also introduced cards from outside the supply that cannot be bought or gained normally, but have special methods which can be used to gain them.

 Hinterlands introduced cards which have special effects when players gain or buy them. It also includes several cards which benefit other players when gained or used.

 Dark Ages has two mechanical themes: trashing cards, and upgrading them to better ones. Many features of the set's cards tend to make a player's deck grow large with cards that are not very useful, which encourages players to trash them. It introduced new ways to gain non-supply cards, ways to play cards from the supply without needing to buy them, cards which can replace players' starting Victory cards, and cards which have effects when they are trashed. Two piles contain copies of several differently-named cards.

 Guilds is themed around more complex uses of money. It introduced coffers, which are tokens that 'save money for later', carried over between turns and expendable as coins for later purchases. It also introduced cards which players may 'overpay' for; based on the extra money spent, these cards provide bonuses which take effect immediately.

 Adventures introduced more ways to gain non-supply cards, and Reserve cards, a variant of Duration cards. Like Durations, Reserve cards stay on the board when you play them; unlike Durations, they do not automatically return on the next turn, but remain until the player chooses to activate their effect. It also introduced Events, the fist landscapes.

 Empires introduced cards with a debt cost; instead of paying coins for them, the player receives debt tokens, which they may later pay to return; until the debt is paid off, the player may not purchase anything else. There are also split piles, in which a cheaper card sits on top, and once all copies of that have been purchased, a second, more expensive card is available; most of these pairs have a synergistic relationship. Like Adventures, it includes Event cards, and it introduces Landmarks. These are landscapes which add more ways to gain or lose victory points.

 Nocturne introduced a new phase of the turn, Night, which occurs after the Buy phase. Night cards are a new type of card which are played during the Night phase. It also introduced Fate and Doom cards, which provide random bonuses and penalties, determined by the new Hex and Boon decks. There are also cards which play cards in the Trash pile; States, which have lingering effects on a player; and cards which replace players' starting Coppers with new Treasures called Heirlooms.

 Renaissance introduced Projects, Artifacts, and villager tokens, and has a strong trashing theme. Projects are landscapes which provide a permanent bonus if bought. Artifacts, like States, are persistent effects which are placed in front of a player and affect them while they are there; each artifact is associated with a particular kingdom card which causes it to change hands. Villagers are tokens players gain and act as saved actions, spent on any later turn to allow them to play an additional action; they are similar to coffers, which also appear in this set, returning from Guilds.

 Menagerie introduced exile mats, Ways, additional Event cards, and many cards which make use of the special card Horse. Exile mats hold cards exiled from players' decks, hands, and/or the supply, which may temporarily remove cards from the player's deck or let them acquire cards indirectly. Ways are landscapes; if a Way is in the game, a player playing an Action card may follow the Way's text rather than the printed text of the Action. Horse cards are in a special pile; they cannot be purchased directly, and are returned to the pile when played.

 Allies introduced favor tokens, which are gained from Liaison cards and can provide benefits or be spent for various purposes using Allies, a new type of landscape. It also features split piles, returning from Empires, but with the variation that these piles may be rotated, allowing the other cards to be bought before exhausting the first type.

 Plunder introduced Loot and Traits. Loots are valuable Treasures that can only be gained via the effects of certain Action and Treasure cards; Traits are landscapes that modify all the cards in a particular pile, for instance by making them cheaper. It also includes more Treasures, Durations, and Events.

History

Initial development 
Vaccarino was a software developer in the 1980s and 1990s. At this time, he created supplements for Dungeons and Dragons and created games based on existing board games. After the release of Magic: The Gathering in 1993, he began designing more seriously and created a 90-card fan expansion, Edge of the World, and became an informal contributor towards additional Magic works; he is credited in the official Magic rulebook. Later, he developed several game ideas and discussed them with Magics creator, Richard Garfield.

In 2006, Vaccarino invented the deck-building mechanic while working on a fantasy adventure card game called "Spirit Warriors II". He struggled with the mechanics before a deadline of showing the game to his gaming group, and spent a weekend stripping it down to its core elements; specifically, having problems with introducing new cards over the course of the game, Vaccarino opted to simply have all cards available at the start. The game immediately became popular with his gaming group, overshadowing the usual staples, including Magic, for the next two years.

With this success, Vaccarino began looking to refine and publish the game. During the 2007 Origins Game Fair, Vaccarino demonstrated the game and gained the interest of Rio Grande Games. Shortly after he signed with Rio Grande, BoardGameGeek's columnists Valerie Putman and Dale Yu requested permission from Rio Grande to develop the game.  During development, Dominion was called "Castle Builder", owing to its theme of building rooms in a castle, and then, later, "Game X". Yu came up with the final name of Dominion. Vaccarino had, early on, planned for the game to grow through expansions, though focused these on maintaining the core functionality of the game instead of immediately adding "exotic things"; this was to ensure that, if the game did take off, early expansions would not create incompatible sets of cards: one focused on the normal Dominion play, and others with a strange new mechanic. In a post to BoardGameGeek, Vaccarino suggested that he had originally planned seven different expansions, and, tuning the core game for release, brought cards into the base game that were originally planned for later expansions.

After release 

As more expansions were released, Vaccarino added new rules to prevent undesirable game situations and permit new mechanics. In 2016, Rio Grande Games began releasing a second edition of the game, which improved layout and adjusted some card effects. The base game and Intrigue were most affected, as some cards were removed, more powerful ones were added, and the base cards were removed from Intrigue. Upgrade packs for players who already owned the first editions of these sets were also sold.

Releases 
Numerous expansions have been released for Dominion, and mini-expansions, most consisting of a set of a single kind of kingdom card, have been released as promotional items. Intrigue has been recommended as the first expansion to purchase after the base set for play. Vaccarino originally planned to stop expanding the game after Guilds, though he conceded:

Two "Big Box" sets have been released. The first contained Dominion First Edition, Alchemy, Prosperity, and the promotional cards Envoy and Black Market. Later editions included alternate promotional cards: Walled Village and Governor. This was released in 2010 and is no longer available. Big Box II was released in 2016, and contains Dominion Second Edition, Intrigue Second Edition, and additional base cards for 5 and 6 player games.

After the release of Menagerie, Dominion included 585 differently named cards and landscapes (such as events), and there were 366 kingdom card piles, including the 6 each in the 1st Edition Base and Intrigue releases that were later replaced. In 2021, researchers calculated that there were over 66 sextillion possible unique game combinations.

Since the game and its expansions feature over 4,000 individual cards, Rio Grande Games has licensed manufacturers' creation of containers to store all the cards into one or two boxes.

Digital versions 
Several unofficial online implementations of Dominion existed before there was a licensed online version; Rio Grande Games requested that these be discontinued once the official online implementation was released. One of these unofficial implementations, however, located at dominion.isotropic.org, was used by Dominion designer Donald X. Vaccarino and his playtesters during the development of new cards, even long after the site was closed to the public.

A licensed browser-based online implementation of Dominion, hosted by Goko, went live in early March 2013. It was originally intended to be released to the public on August 16, 2012, but because of bugs and server overload, it was withdrawn from public release and returned to beta testing. The official app provided the base Dominion game free to play, and cards from the expansions available for a fee. In October 2015, the official Goko online implementation of Dominion transitioned to a new official 2.0 online implementation developed by Making Fun. Making Fun honored all purchases made by customers from the original Goko implementation, but in February 2016, John Welch, CEO of Making Fun announced that the license granted to Making Fun by Rio Grande Games to develop the official online Dominion game would expire at the end of 2016, and would not be renewed with Making Fun. From January 1, 2017, development of the official online Dominion game is licensed to Shuffle iT, a company formed by two high-ranked Dominion players. They were dissatisfied with all prior online implementations of Dominion and proposed their new approach to Vaccarino, who was impressed with what the two developers were able to do and gave them the license.

Temple Gates Games released a licensed version of Dominion for Microsoft Windows, iOS and Android devices in early access in October 2021. This game was developed using artificial intelligence and neural networks to provide viable computer opponents, which the developers claim was advanced enough to be able to learn new cards that were not used in training. The game is offered as a free-to-play game that includes the original base Dominion game, with paid downloadable content for each of the card game's expansions.

Reception
The original Dominion set won several awards, including the Spiel des Jahres, the Deutscher Spiele Preis, an Origins award and a Diana Jones Award. In addition, it and the expansions have sold more than 2.5 million copies and been translated into 18 languages: Chinese, Czech, Dutch, Finnish, French, German, Greek, Hungarian, Italian, Japanese, Korean, bokmål Norwegian, Polish, Portuguese, Romanian, Russian, Spanish and Swedish.

Dominion is one of the first board games that included a deckbuilding mechanic. Board games, such as Mage Knight Board Game, use deckbuilding as a core game mechanic, the origins of which can be attributed to Dominion.

Dominion has been praised for its speed and simplicity, as well as its strategic depth; there are many ways to win. Other reviewers have noted the game’s replayability. However, it has been criticised as "almost abstract" for its weak theme, described as "multiplayer solitaire", and the theme has been criticised as generic, though a minor issue in the playability.

Dominion and the Kennerspiel Des Jahres 

The Spiel des Jahres, a highly prestigious prize, is primarily intended for family games, and the winner is generally purchased in large volume within Germany for that purpose. Dominion received this prize in 2009, and two years later, a second prize, Kennerspiel des Jahres, was created, intended for more complex games aimed at audiences of adults; the name literally means "Expert-game of the year". Dominion's prize had received backlash, as many families considered it too complex for a family game. This is widely credited as an influential event in the establishment of the Kennerspiel prize. In both the year prior to Dominion's award, and the year following, complex games received ad-hoc special prizes, which had been awarded intermittently in earlier years as well, and 2009 was notable in that a complex game received an award, but crowded out the 'main' family-game award. Further controversies of this kind have not occurred since the first Kennerspiel prize in 2011, suggesting that, if this was the goal, it has been successful.

Awards 

 2008 Origins Award for Best Traditional Card Game
 2008 Meeples Choice Awards
 2009 Spiel Des Jahres
 2009 Deutscher Spiele Preis
 2009 Mensa Select
 2009 Golden Geek Award (Game of the Year & Card Game of the Year)
 2009 Diana Jones Award for Excellence in Gaming
 2009 Origins Award, Best Card Game
 2009 BoardGamer.ru (Russia), Best Card Game of the Year
 2009 Boughtalot.ru, best game of the year

References

External links 

 Dominion at Rio Grande Games
 
 Strategy Wiki
 Dominion Online

Card games introduced in 2008
Deck-building card games
Deutscher Spiele Preis winners
Mensa Select winners
Origins Award winners
Rio Grande Games games
Spiel des Jahres winners